The 1906–07 RPI men's ice hockey season was the 4th season of play for the program.

Season
After a two-year absence the RPI ice hockey team returned to varsity status and put together its first season of more than one game. Rensselaer's first two games came at the end of December on a visit to Pittsburgh where they split against local universities. The next match didn't happen for over a month but when they hit the ice again the cherries were able to defeat Army to finish with a winning record.

Note: Rensselaer's athletic teams were unofficially known as 'Cherry and White' until 1921 when the Engineers moniker debuted for the men's basketball team.

Roster

Standings

Schedule and Results

|-
!colspan=12 style=";" | Regular Season

References

RPI Engineers men's ice hockey seasons
RPI
RPI
RPI
RPI